Elections to the Richmond upon Thames London Borough Council were held on 4 May 2006. The whole council was up for election for the first time since the 2002 election. The Liberal Democrats regained control of the council which had been Conservative run from 2002.

Election result

|}

Ward results
The electorate of each ward elects three councillors.

Barnes

East Sheen

Fulwell and Hampton Hill

Ham, Petersham, and Richmond Riverside

Hampton

Hampton North

Hampton Wick

Heathfield

Kew

Mortlake and Barnes Common

North Richmond

South Richmond

South Twickenham

St Margaret's and North Twickenham

Teddington

Twickenham Riverside

West Twickenham

Whitton

References 

2006
2006 London Borough council elections